Vern Swanson (born July 2, 1941) is a former Republican member of the Kansas House of Representatives, representing the 64th district.  He served from 2007 to 2015.

Swanson was born in Clay Center, Kansas and studied at Emporia State University. He was originally elected to the Kansas House in 2006, taking office in 2007; after serving for four terms there, he declined to run for re-election, and was succeeded by his wife, Susie Swanson. After his time in the legislature, he served on the board of the Kansas State Historical Society.

Committee membership
 Energy and Utilities
 Transportation
 Transportation and Public Safety Budget (Vice-Chair)

Major donors
The top 5 donors to Swanson's 2008 campaign:
1. Kansas Contractors Assoc 	$1,000
2. Koch Industries 	$1,000 	
3. AT&T 	$750 	
4. Twin Valley Telephone Inc 	$500
5. Kansans for Lifesaving Cures 	$500

References

External links
 Kansas Legislature - Vern Swanson
 Project Vote Smart profile
 Kansas Votes profile
 State Surge - Legislative and voting track record
 Campaign contributions: 2006, 2008

Republican Party members of the Kansas House of Representatives
Living people
1941 births
21st-century American politicians
Emporia State University alumni